Route 72, commonly known as Kalanianaole Highway, is the main highway serving southeast Oahu. Beginning at the eastern terminus of Interstate H-1 (H-1), the east–west highway travels along the southeastern shore of Oahu through various residential neighborhoods, including Hawaii Kai. It turns northwest at Makapuu and runs through Waimānalo before terminating in Maunawili at an intersection with Kamehameha Highway and Pali Highway. The highway is named for Jonah Kūhiō Kalanianaole, a former prince of the Kingdom of Hawaii.

Route description

Route 72 begins as an extension of Interstate H-1 (the Lunalilo Freeway), near the Kahala Mall in eastern Honolulu. The six-lane road travels east through a residential neighborhood along the north side of the Waialae Country Club towards the Pacific Coast. At Wailupe Beach, it turns northeast and continues along the coast through ʻĀina Haina, crossing several streams and suburban lagoons.

The highway turns southeast near Hawaiʻi Kai, crossing the inland waters of the Kui Channel and climbing part of Koko Crater.

The highway was named for Jonah Kūhiō Kalanianaʻole, a Hawaiian prince and later Congressman who attempted to restore Queen Liliʻuokalani to the throne after the 1893 overthrow by American residents.

Major intersections

See also

 List of Hawaii state highways

References

External links

0072
Transportation in Honolulu County, Hawaii